The 2013 Akron Zips football team represented the University of Akron in the 2013 NCAA Division I FBS football season. They were led by second-year head coach Terry Bowden and played their home games at InfoCision Stadium–Summa Field. They were a member of the East Division of the Mid-American Conference and finished the season with a  record.

Schedule

 Source: Schedule

Roster

References

External links

Akron
Akron Zips football seasons
Akron Zips football